Eric House (November 22, 1921 – March 21, 2004) was a Canadian actor. Although he appeared in film, television and stage roles throughout his career, he was most famously associated with stage roles at the Stratford Festival, particularly its productions of musical comedies by Gilbert and Sullivan, and as Dean Drone in Sunshine Sketches, the first Canadian television drama series.

House was born and raised in Toronto, Ontario. After serving in the Canadian military during World War II, he enrolled as a geography student at the University of Toronto, and began acting with the Hart House Theatre. He joined the Canadian Repertory Theatre in 1951, and subsequently acted at Stratford and with the Toronto-based Crest Theatre. He was a founding member of the Canadian Actors' Equity Association. He also worked in theatre across Canada, both as an actor and a director, and had a number of roles on Broadway in New York City, appearing in productions of Tamburlaine, The Makropulos Affair, Two Gentlemen of Verona, Soldiers and H.M.S. Pinafore, and at least one role in London's West End, in a production of Mrs. Gibbons' Boys. In 1962, he appeared alongside Corinne Conley, Dave Broadfoot, Jack Creley and Eric Christmas in the musical revue Clap Hands at London's Hammersmith Theatre.

His film roles included Anne of Green Gables (1956), and Oedipus Rex (1957), while his television roles included frequent appearances in the CBC Television drama anthology series Playdate, Folio and Festival, A Gift to Last and the shortlived comedy series Delilah. He received a Canadian Film Award nomination for Best Actor in 1969 for his performance in "The Night Nothing Happened", an episode of the drama series Quentin Durgens, M.P..
In a 1974 IMAX movie "Snow Job" he played a school principal; this movie was featured at Toronto's Ontario Place Cinesphere

In later years he returned to Stratford, appearing in productions of Hamlet and Troilus and Cressida. His final television role was a small appearance as a judge in two episodes of Street Legal.

He died of emphysema on March 21, 2004.

Filmography

References

External links

1921 births
2004 deaths
Canadian male film actors
Canadian male television actors
Canadian male stage actors
Canadian male musical theatre actors
Canadian male Shakespearean actors
Canadian theatre directors
Deaths from emphysema
Male actors from Toronto
20th-century Canadian male actors
20th-century Canadian male singers
Canadian military personnel of World War II
Canadian expatriates in the United States